Drimia nagarjunae is a species of flowering plant in the family Asparagaceae, subfamily Scilloideae. It was included in Drimia indica, but is accepted as a separate species. It is distributed in south India.

Taxonomy
Drimia nagarjunae was first described, as Urginea nagarjunae by Hemadri and Swahari in 1982. They noted that it had been previously mistaken for Drimia indica, but differed in having a thicker scape, flowers closer together in the inflorescence and with tepals that are not reflexed. The specific epithet refers to Nagarjunakonda, near Nagarjuna Sagar Dam where the bulb is first identified; bulbs of the new species had been collected in a "medico-ethnobotanical survey". Hemadri and Swahari's differentiation of D. nagarjunae from D. indica was initially not accepted, but it is now considered to be a separate species.

References

Scilloideae
Flora of the Indian subcontinent